Nicholas Alexander Folk (born November 5, 1984) is an American football placekicker for the New England Patriots of the National Football League (NFL). He played college football at Arizona, where he received first-team All-Pac-10 honors, and was selected by the Dallas Cowboys in the sixth round of the 2007 NFL Draft. During his three seasons with the Cowboys, Folk was named to the Pro Bowl as a rookie. He played his next seven seasons as a member of the New York Jets, becoming the franchise's second-leading scorer. Following an unsuccessful stint on the Tampa Bay Buccaneers, Folk spent a year away from football before pursuing a comeback in 2019 with the Arizona Hotshots of the Alliance of American Football (AAF). Folk returned to the NFL the same year as a member of the Patriots and led the league in scoring during the 2021 season.

Early years
Folk was born in Los Angeles, California, he played high school football at Notre Dame High School, Sherman Oaks, California, where as a senior, he was named "All-CIF" as a punter and second-team as a placekicker.  Folk was also captain of the soccer team and earned All-CIF Division, all-league, and All-Valley honors.

College career
Folk accepted a football scholarship from the University of Arizona. He became the starter as a sophomore. The longest field goal of his college career, a 52-yarder, came in 2005 against USC. During his sophomore year, he also took over the punting duties in addition to his kicking duties.

He earned All-Pac-10 honors as a senior. He finished his college career after making 30-of-47 field goals, 79-of-81 extra points, and 96 punts for 4,242 yards (44.2 avg.), including a long of 61 yards.

Professional career

Dallas Cowboys

2007 season
Folk was selected by the Dallas Cowboys in the sixth round (178th overall) of the 2007 NFL Draft. Folk made the longest kick of his career to that point, a 53-yard game winner against the Buffalo Bills on Monday Night Football during his rookie season. That season, he became the first Cowboys rookie Pro Bowl kicker, after being selected to serve as the NFC's kicker during the 2008 Pro Bowl, having gone 26-of-31 in field goal attempts and making all 53 extra points he attempted during the season. Folk also broke the Cowboys single-season record for most points by a placekicker (131) during his rookie season.

2008 season
In 2008, Folk continued his strong performance as he made 91% of his kicks and once again made all of his extra point attempts. Following the 2008 season, Folk discovered a problem with his hip that the Cowboys medical personnel diagnosed in his flexor, but it did not heal with the prescribed treatment. After conducting more tests, it was discovered that Folk had a torn labrum and underwent surgery in May 2009. The normal recovery period would have had Folk returning near the beginning of training camp but Folk rushed his rehab and as a result, the hip did not heal properly.

2009 season
Folk struggled as he entered his third season with the Cowboys in 2009. His performance was erratic, evidenced by the fact that he only made 64.3% of his field goals, converting 18 out of 28 opportunities. On December 19, 2009, Folk attempted a 23-yard field goal against the New Orleans Saints that would have increased the Cowboys lead to ten points; earlier in the game, he had successfully kicked a 51-yard field goal. However, he missed as the ball hit the goalpost. Although the Cowboys won the game, the team lost faith in Folk and he was waived on December 21, and was replaced by Shaun Suisham.

New York Jets

2010 season
On February 23, Folk signed a one-year contract with the New York Jets. Head coach Rex Ryan mocked Folk's early performances during the team's offseason workouts; however, after working out with special teams coordinator Mike Westhoff, who helped refine Folk's kicking technique after allowing his hip to fully recover, Folk began to gain consistency once again.

On October 11, Folk became the first Jets kicker to kick five field goals in a home game since Pat Leahy achieved the feat in 1984. Folk set a franchise record for the longest kick, making a career long kick of 56 yards against the Denver Broncos on October 17.

During the 2010 season, Folk converted 30 field goals out of 39 opportunities. During the AFC Wild Card Round against the Indianapolis Colts on January 8, 2011, Folk kicked the game-winning field goal with only 3 seconds remaining in the 4th quarter, helping the team make their second straight AFC Championship where they would end up losing to the Pittsburgh Steelers.

2011 season
During Week 1 on September 11, 2011, Folk kicked a 50-yard field goal with 27 seconds left to give the Jets a 27–24 victory over his former team, the Dallas Cowboys. During the 2011 season, Folk converted 19 field goals out of 25 opportunities.

2012 season

On March 14, Folk was re-signed by the Jets. During the 2012 season, Folk converted 21 field goals in 27 opportunities.

2013 season
In the preseason, Folk beat out Billy Cundiff for the Jets' starting kicker role. In the first game of the season, with 7 seconds left in the game, Folk successfully kicked a field goal from 48 yards to give the Jets an 18–17 win over the Tampa Bay Buccaneers. In Week 5, Folk kicked the game-winning field goal as time expired in a 30–28 win at the Atlanta Falcons. During an AFC East rivalry game against the New England Patriots in Week 7, Folk kicked another gaming-winning field goal to give the Jets a 30–27 overtime victory.

Folk's career-high and Jets record of 23 consecutive field goals made was snapped after missing from 48 yards during a 37–14 loss against the Bills. He established a franchise record in field goal percentage (91.7), after making 33-of-36 field goal attempts and his 23 consecutive field goals also ranked second in Jets history.

2014 season
Set to become a free agent during the 2014 offseason, it was announced on February 28, 2014, that the Jets had placed the franchise tag on Folk. On March 10, it was announced that Folk had signed a 4-year, $12 million contract. He led the league in field goal attempts (39), tied for third in field goals made (32), and set a franchise record for the longest field goal made at home (55 yards).

2015 season
In pregame warm-ups against the Jacksonville Jaguars, he suffered a season-ending quad injury. On November 10, 2015, Folk was placed on the team's injured reserve. In eight games, he finished the year making 13 field goals out of 16 opportunities. He also made all 19 extra point attempts.

2016 season
Returning from a quad injury, Folk played all 16 games in the 2016 season, making 27 field goals out of 31 opportunities. He also made 24 extra points out of 26 opportunities.

On February 23, 2017, he was released in a salary cap move. He ranks second on the franchise's all-time list in points scored (729), second in field goals made (175), and first in field goal percentage (81.3).

Tampa Bay Buccaneers
On March 17, 2017, Folk was signed as a free agent by the Tampa Bay Buccaneers, to compete with the previous year's second-round draft choice Roberto Aguayo. On August 12 the Buccaneers released Aguayo after missing two kicks in a preseason game. The Buccaneers then signed Zach Hocker to compete with Folk for the starting kicking job. On September 1, the Buccaneers released Zach Hocker giving Folk the starting job. In Week 5 on Thursday Night Football, he missed three field goals, at 56, 49, and 31 yards, in a 19–14 loss to the New England Patriots. On October 9, 2017, he was placed on injured reserve with a "minor injury" classification. By rule, following his removal from the team's injured reserve, he was required to be released to free agency.

On February 22, 2018, Folk was released from the Buccaneers.

Arizona Hotshots
On January 25, 2019, Folk attended a tryout with the Chicago Bears, but was not offered a contract. The next day, he signed with the Arizona Hotshots of the Alliance of American Football. Folk was the record-holder for the longest AAF field goal at 55 yards. The league ceased operations in April 2019.

New England Patriots
On October 29, 2019, following the release of Mike Nugent, Folk was signed by the New England Patriots. On November 28, 2019, it was revealed that Folk had undergone an appendectomy and was ruled out for at least a week. He was released the following day, after the team signed Kai Forbath. On December 6, 2019, Folk was re-signed by the Patriots.

After becoming a free agent in March 2020, Folk had a tryout with the Cleveland Browns on August 19, 2020, and visited the Patriots on August 22, 2020.
The Patriots re-signed Folk on August 24, 2020. On September 5, 2020, Folk was released by the team and signed with the practice squad the next day. The Patriots elevated Folk to the active roster ahead of their Week 1 game against the Miami Dolphins. In the game, Folk went 3-for-3 on PAT attempts, and 0-for-1 on field goal attempts. He reverted to the practice squad after the game, and he was promoted to the active roster on September 16.

In Week 9 against his former team, the New York Jets, Folk was a perfect three for three on extra point attempts and three for three on field goal attempts including the 51-yard game-winning field goal during the 30–27 win. Folk was named the AFC Special Teams Player of the Week for his performance in Week 9.
In Week 12 against the Arizona Cardinals, Folk hit the 50-yard game-winning field goal during the 20–17 win. Folk was named the AFC Special Teams Player of the Week for his performance in Week 12.

On March 23, 2021, Folk re-signed with the Patriots. After missing much of training camp due to an undisclosed injury, Folk was released during the final roster cuts and was signed to the practice squad the following day. He was named to the roster for Week 1. In Week 2 against the Jets, Folk gave the Patriots a 3–0 lead by making his 30th field goal in a row. He made his 31st field goal in a row just before halftime against the Jets, which tied the Patriots record for consecutive field goals made held by Stephen Gostkowski. Folk set the record with his 32nd consecutive field goal in the second half. He was officially signed to the active roster on September 21. His streak of field goals came to an end in week 4 at 36 in a row. Late in the 4th quarter, during the game noted for the return of Tom Brady, the Patriots were trailing 17–19 when Folk attempted a 56-yard field goal in the pouring rain, which had plenty of distance but hit the upright.

On October 13, 2021, Folk was named AFC Special Teams Player of the Week for his performance in the Patriots' 25-22 win over the Houston Texans. Folk connected on all four of his field goal attempts against a hapless Houston team (52, 52, 32, and 21 yards) including the game-winning 21-yard field goal to give the Patriots their 2nd win of the 2021 season.

Folk re-signed with the Patriots on March 15, 2022 to a two-year, $5 million deal. On September 25, Folk set an NFL record for most consecutive field goals under 50 yards, hitting his 57th consecutive under 50 yard field goal in a loss against the Baltimore Ravens. On October 16, his streak ended at 64 following a miss on a 45 yard field goal in a win against the Cleveland Browns. In Week 8, Folk converted all five field goals and one extra point in a 22-17 win over the New York Jets, earning AFC Special Teams Player of the Week.

Following the placement of Patriots punter Jake Bailey on injured reserve, Folk became the Patriot's main kickoff specialist.

NFL career statistics

Career awards and highlights
 Pro Bowl (2007)
 PFWA All-NFC (2007)
 7× AFC Special Teams Player of the Week (Week 5 - 2010, Week 1 - 2013, Week 9 - 2013, Week 9 - 2020, Week 12 - 2020, Week 5 - 2021, Week 8 - 2022)
 NFC Special Teams Player of the Week (Week 5, 2007)
 Diet Pepsi NFL Rookie of the Week (Week 5, 2007)
 PFWA NFL All-Rookie Team
 NFL scoring leader in 2021 (150 points) - Tied with Daniel Carlson

Personal life
Folk was born to Anton and Kathryn Folk in Bavaria, as Niklaus Faulke. His father, who was born in Austria to Bavarian parents, is an accountant. Folk's mother is a pediatrician. Nick Folk and his younger brothers, Erik and Gregory, are dual citizens of the United States and Germany, where his father grew up.

Erik was the placekicker for the University of Washington Huskies football team through the 2011 season. Gregory Folk was a soccer player for UCLA and has played for Los Angeles Galaxy. The Folks' cousin, Blake Robinson, was diagnosed with neurofibromatosis when at eighteen months of age. Folk partnered with the Children's Tumor Foundation to support the research of NF.

He majored in marketing at Arizona. He is an avid soccer fan, attends New York Red Bulls games when in the area, and is a member of the Viking Army Supporters Club. He is married to his wife, Julianne, and they have 4 children; twin boys, a daughter, and another younger son.

References

External links
Arizona Wildcats bio

1984 births
Living people
American football placekickers
American people of German descent
Players of American football from Los Angeles
Arizona Wildcats football players
Dallas Cowboys players
New England Patriots players
New York Jets players
Tampa Bay Buccaneers players
National Conference Pro Bowl players
Arizona Hotshots players